The Dorrance Inn, also known as the Samuel Dorrance House, is a historic former inn at 748 Plainfield Pike in Sterling, Connecticut.  Built about 1722, it  is notable as a place that hosted officers of the French Army in 1781 and 1782, as it was along the march route taken by French commander Rochambeau's troops en route to Yorktown, Virginia.  Dorrance's Inn is one of a few places mentioned by name in multiple accounts written by French officers.  The building was individually listed on the National Register of Historic Places in 2002. and is a contributing building in the Sterling Hill Historic District.

Description and history
The former Dorrance Inn stands on the eastern edge of Sterling's main village, just east of the Congregational Church on the north side of Plainfield Pike (Connecticut Route 14A).  The road is a historically major east-west route through the town.  The house is a -story wood-frame structure, five bays wide, with a side-gable roof and a large central chimney.  The oldest portion of the house, consisting of the eastern three bays, was built c. 1722.  The eastern bays were added later, but do not extend the full depth of the house.  Greek Revival treatments were added to the front door and house corners in the 19th century.

The house was the home and inn of Samuel Dorrance at the time of the American Revolutionary War, and is one of the few places mentioned specifically by name in multiple French accounts of the army's 1781 and 1782 marches across Connecticut.  Dorrance played host to the Marquis de Chastellux among others, and Rochambeau dined here on the return march in 1782.  George Washington is also recorded as having stayed here in 1781.  The inn lies along a well-preserved segment of Rochambeau's march route.

See also
March Route of Rochambeau's army
List of historic sites preserved along Rochambeau's route
National Register of Historic Places listings in Windham County, Connecticut

References

Hotel buildings on the National Register of Historic Places in Connecticut
Hotels in Connecticut
Buildings and structures in Windham County, Connecticut
Sterling, Connecticut
Historic places on the Washington–Rochambeau Revolutionary Route
National Register of Historic Places in Windham County, Connecticut
Historic district contributing properties in Connecticut